Puthu Paatu is a 1990 Indian Tamil-language film written and directed by Panchu Arunachalam, and produced by Ilaiyaraaja. The film stars Ramarajan, Vaidegi, Suma and Rajeev. It was released on 17 October 1990.

Plot

Cast

Ramarajan as Ramu
Vaidegi as Kaveri
Suma as Raji
Rajeev as Raji's brother
Goundamani
Senthil
Senthamarai
Livingston
Karuppu Subbiah
Vellai Subbaiah
Thideer Kannaiah
Periya Karuppu Thevar
Nizhalgal Ravi in Special Appearance
Ramya Krishnan in Special Appearance
Vaishnavi in Special Appearance
Vishnukanth as young Rajeev 
Sivaraman
Nagaraja Chozhan
Cenchi Krishnan
M. L. A. Thangaraj
Kuchi Babu
Vaathiyar Raman
A. Sukantala
Vijaya Chandrika
Devi
Balu
Boopathi Raja
Jagadeesan
Kaalai
Nethaji
Vishnukanth

Soundtrack
The music was composed by Ilaiyaraaja.

References

External links 
 

1990 films
1990s Tamil-language films
Films directed by Panchu Arunachalam
Films scored by Ilaiyaraaja
Films set in Germany
Films shot in Ooty